The University of Padua (UNIPD) is an Italian university located in the city of Padua, region of Veneto, northern Italy. The University of Padua was founded in 1222 by a group of students and teachers from Bologna. Padua is the second-oldest university in Italy and the world's fifth-oldest surviving university. In 2010, the university had approximately 65,000 students. In 2021, it was ranked second "best university" among Italian institutions of higher education with more than 40,000 students according to Censis institute, and among the best 200 universities in the world according to ARWU.

History
The university is conventionally said to have been founded in 1222 when a large group of students and professors left the University of Bologna in search of more academic freedom ('Libertas scholastica'). The first subjects to be taught were law and theology. The curriculum expanded rapidly, and by 1399 the institution had divided in two: a Universitas Iuristarum for civil law and Canon law, and a Universitas Artistarum which taught astronomy, dialectic, philosophy, grammar, medicine, and rhetoric. There was also a Universitas Theologorum, established in 1373 by Urban V.

The student body was divided into groups known as "nations" which reflected their places of origin. The nations themselves fell into two groups:

 the cismontanes for the Italian students 
 the ultramontanes for those who came from beyond the Alps

From the fifteenth to the eighteenth century, the university was renowned for its research, particularly in the areas of medicine, astronomy, philosophy and law. During this time, the university adopted the Latin motto: Universa universis patavina libertas (Paduan Freedom is Universal for Everyone). Nevertheless, the university had a turbulent history, and there was no teaching in 1237–61, 1509–17, 1848–50.

The Botanical Garden of Padova, established by the university in 1545, is one of the oldest gardens of its kind in the world. Its alleged title of oldest academic garden is in controversy because the Medici created one in Pisa in 1544. In addition to the garden, best visited in the spring and summer, the university also manages nine museums, including a History of physics museum.

The university began teaching medicine around 1250. It played a leading role in the identification and treatment of diseases and ailments, specializing in autopsies and the inner workings of the body.

Since 1595, Padua's famous anatomical theatre drew artists and scientists studying the human body during public dissections. It is the oldest surviving permanent anatomical theatre in Europe.  Anatomist Andreas Vesalius held the chair of Surgery and Anatomy (explicator chirurgiae) and in 1543 published his anatomical discoveries in De Humani Corporis Fabrica. The book triggered great public interest in dissections and caused many other European cities to establish anatomical theatres.

On 25 June 1678, Elena Lucrezia Cornaro Piscopia, a Venetian noblewoman and mathematician, became the first woman to be awarded a Doctor of Philosophy degree.

The university became one of the universities of the Kingdom of Italy in 1873, and ever since has been one of the most prestigious in the country for its contributions to scientific and scholarly research: in the field of mathematics alone, its professors have included such figures as Gregorio Ricci Curbastro, Giuseppe Veronese, Francesco Severi and Tullio Levi Civita.

The last years of the nineteenth and the first half of the twentieth century saw a reversal of the centralisation process that had taken place in the sixteenth: scientific institutes were set up in what became veritable campuses; a new building to house the Arts and Philosophy faculty was built in another part of the city centre (Palazzo del Liviano, designed by Giò Ponti); the Astro-Physics Observatory was built on the Asiago uplands; and the old Palazzo del Bo was fully restored (1938–45). The vicissitudes of the Fascist period—political interference, the Race Laws, etc.—had a detrimental effect upon the development of the university, as did the devastation caused by the Second World War and—just a few decades later—the effect of the student protests of 1968-69 (which the university was left to face without adequate help and support from central government). However, the Gymnasium Omnium Disciplinarum continued its work uninterrupted, and overall the second half of the twentieth century saw a sharp upturn in development—primarily due an interchange of ideas with international institutions of the highest standing (particularly in the fields of science and technology).

In recent years, the university has been able to meet the problems posed by overcrowded facilities by re-deploying over the Veneto as a whole. In 1990, the Institute of Management Engineering was set up in Vicenza, after which the summer courses at Brixen (Bressanone) began once more, and in 1995 the Agripolis centre at Legnaro (for Agricultural Science and Veterinary Medicine) opened. Other sites of re-deployment are at Rovigo, Treviso, Feltre, Castelfranco Veneto, Conegliano, Chioggia and Asiago.

Recent changes in state legislation have also opened the way to greater autonomy for Italian universities, and in 1995 Padua adopted a new Statute that gave it greater independence.

As the publications of innumerable conferences and congresses show, the modern-day University of Padua plays an important role in scholarly and scientific research at both a European and world level. True to its origins, this is the direction in which the university intends to move in the future, establishing closer links of cooperation and exchange with all the world's major research universities.

Rankings 
The university is constantly ranked among the best Italian universities.

ARWU ranks the university in the Italian top 4 alongside the Sapienza University of Rome, the University of Milan and the University of Pisa. ARWU ranks the university in the 151st-200th range globally for 2021. The 2021 Times Higher Education World University Rankings  lists the university at 4th place in Italy and in the 201st-250th range worldwide. QS World University Rankings ranks the university 4th in Italy in 2021 and the best in Italy to study geology and geophysics, earth and sea sciences, biological sciences, psychology, anatomy and physiology. It also places the University of Padua at 242nd in the world for 2021.

In the 2020 U.S. News & World Reports World Best Global Universities Rankings, the University of Padua is ranked the world's 116th, tied with the University of Bologna, and 48th in Europe.

The NTU ranking, which focuses on productivity and quality of scientific production, places the University of Padua as 82nd worldwide for 2022.

Notable people

Alumni
Notable people who have attended the University of Padua include:

In natural sciences
Nicolaus Copernicus (1473–1543) Polish mathematician and astronomer, placed Sun at center of Solar System
John Caius (1510–1573) English physician 
Vesalius (1514–1564) known as founder of modern human anatomy; offered professorship at Padua, but died
Gabriele Falloppio (1523–1562) anatomist; anatomy of head and internal ear; reproductive organs
Sir Francis Walsingham (ca 1532–1590) spymaster for Queen Elizabeth I
William Harvey (1578–1657) anatomist; described function of heart and circulatory system
George Ent (1604–1689) English anatomist, supporter of Harvey
Thomas Browne (1605–1682) English writer and physician
Sir Edward Greaves  (1608–1680) English physician. 
Nathaniel Eaton (1610-1674), Ph.D. and M.D., first Head Master of Harvard College
Tommaso Perelli (1704-1783), Italian astronomer
Federico Faggin (1941-)  designer of the first commercial microprocessor
Mario Rizzetto  (1945–) Italian virologist; worked with Hepatitis D virus
Luigi Dall'Igna   (1966-) General manager of Ducati Corse

In politics and government
 Abdirahman Jama Barre (1937-2017), Foreign Minister of Somalia
 Ioannis Kapodistrias (1776-1831), 1st Governor of Greece, Foreign Minister of the Russian Empire
 Luigi Luzzatti (1841-1927), financier, political economist, social philosopher and jurist, 20th Prime Minister of Italy
 Alexandros Mavrokordatos (1791-1865), Prime Minister of Greece
 Seneschal Constantine Cantacuzino Stolnic (c. 1650–1716), Romanian nobleman and humanist scholar who held high offices in the Principality of Wallachia. Author of a History of Wallachia (unfinished), he was the first Romanian to ever graduate from this prestigious university.
Jan Zamoyski, Polish nobleman, magnate, diplomat and statesman
Daniele Franco, Italian economist, Draghi Cabinet Finance Minister.
Ludovico Trevisan (1401-1465), Cardinal, Camerlengo of the Holy Roman Church, Archbishop of Florence, Patriarch of Aquileia, Captain General of the Church, and physician.

In arts, theology and literature
 Saint Albertus Magnus
 Cardinal Stanislaus Hosius
Nicolas of Cusa (1401–1464), in canon law. German philosopher, theologian, jurist, and astronomer.
 Sir John Tiptoft, Earl of Worcester (1458–64)
George Acworth, Anglican priest and civil lawyer
Reginald Pole, cardinal
Jacopo Zabarella (1533–1589) physics, metaphysics, and mathematics.
Theophilos Corydalleus (1563–1546) Greek Neo-Aristotelian philosopher, started Korydalism.
Saint Francis de Sales (1567-1622), double doctorate "in utroque jure," that is, in canon and civil law (1591) 
Boris Pahor, writer
Giovanni Pico, humanist
Elena Cornaro Piscopia (1646-1684), first woman to receive a doctor of philosophy degree
Angelus Silesius, German priest, physician and poet
Francysk Skaryna, printer of the first book in an Eastern Slavic language
Giuseppe Tartini, musician and composer
Torquato Tasso, poet
Edgar Manas, composer
Mikołaj Kiczka, nobleman, diplomat and priest
Moses Hayyim Luzzatto, kabbalist and playwright, founder of Hebrew literature
Ugo Foscolo
Pietro Bembo, poet and cardinal
Pomponio Algerio, student of civil law (1550s) executed under the Roman Catholic Inquisition
Daniele Barbaro, translator of Vitruvius
Ermolao Barbaro (1454–1493) Italian renaissance scholar
Francesco Barbaro, humanist
Giacomo Casanova, traveller, author and seducer
Roger Manners, 5th Earl of Rutland and poet and abettor of Essex's Rebellion
István Szamosközy, humanist and historian from Transylvania, the leading figure of Hungarian historiography at the beginning of the 17th century

Notable faculty

Ermolao Barbaro (1454–1493), appointed professor of philosophy in 1477
Leonik Tomeu (1456-1531) first to teach Aristotle in original Greek
Jacopo Zabarella (1533–1589) held chairs of logic, and philosophy, from 1564 to 1589
Galileo Galilei (1564–1642) held chair of mathematics between 1592 and 1610
Elena Cornaro Piscopia (1646 – 1684), mathematics lecturer, and the first woman to receive a PhD degree
Antonio Vallisneri (1661–1730) held chairs of practical medicine, and theoretical medicine, between 1700 and 1730
Giovanni Battista Morgagni (1681-1771) held chairs of theoretical medicine, and anatomy, between 1711 and 1771
Tullio Levi-Civita (1873-1941) held the chair of Rational Mechanics, famous for his work on the absolute differential calculus (tensor calculus) and many other important contributions in the area of Pure and Applied Mathematics
Concetto Marchesi (1878-1857) rector from 1943 to 1953
Massimo Marchiori (1970–) Assoc. Prof. (2006–); Italian computer scientist and inventor of Hypersearch
Patrizia Pontisso (1955-) Professor of internal medicine
Sergio Bettini (1905-1986) professor of History of Medieval Art and History of Art Criticism
Gianfranco Folena (1920-1992) Professor of the History of the Italian Language 
Gian Piero Brunetta (b. 1942) Professor of cinema history and criticism
Emilio Quaia Professor of radiology

Departments

The University of Padua offers a wide range of degrees, organized by Departments:
 Department of Agronomy, Food, Natural Resources, Animals and the Environment
 Department of Biology
 Department of Animal Medicine, Production and Health
 Department of Biomedical Sciences
 Department of Cardiac, Thoracic and Vascular Sciences
 Department of Chemical Sciences
 Department of Civil, Environmental and Architectural Engineering
 Department of Communication Sciences
 Department of Comparative Biomedicine and Food Science
 Department of Cultural Heritage: Archaeology and History of Art, Cinema and Music
 Department of Developmental Psychology and Socialisation
 Department of Economics and Management
 Department of General Psychology
 Department of Geosciences
Department of Historical and Geographic Sciences and the Ancient World
 Department of Industrial Engineering
 Department of Information Engineering
 Department of Land, Environment, Agriculture and Forestry
 Department of Linguistic and Literary Studies
 Department of Management and Engineering
 Department of Mathematics
 Department of Medicine
 Department of Molecular Medicine
 Department of Neurosciences
 Department of Pharmaceutical and Pharmacological Sciences
 Department of Philosophy, Sociology, Education and Applied Psychology
 Department of Physics and Astronomy
 Department of Political and Juridical Sciences and International Studies
 Department of Private Law and Critique of Law
 Department of Public, International and Community Law
 Department of Statistical Sciences
 Department of Surgery, Oncology and Gastroenterology
 Department of Women's and Children's Health

Schools
Departments have been united in a limited number of Schools:
 Agricultural science and Veterinary medicine
 Economics and Political sciences
 Engineering
 Human and social sciences and cultural heritage
 Law
 Medicine and surgery
 Psychology
 Sciences

See also
List of oldest universities in continuous operation
List of Italian universities
 List of medieval universities
 List of split up universities
ICoN Interuniversity Consortium for Italian Studies
Padua
Coimbra Group
Top Industrial Managers for Europe

References

External links

 Scholars and Literati at the University of Padua (1222–1800), Repertorium Eruditorum Totius Europae – RETE
University of Padua Website 
Museums of the University 
Faculty of Engineering 
University Human Rights Centre 

 
Buildings and structures in Padua
1222 establishments in Europe
13th-century establishments in Italy
Padua, University of
Education in Veneto
Engineering universities and colleges in Italy
Biosafety level 3 laboratories
History of Padua